"Di Da Di (And So the Story Goes)" is a 1997 song by Danish singer-songwriter Maria Montell, released as the first single from her second album, And So The Story Goes. Originally released in Danish in 1996, as "Imens hun sang (Di Da Di)" ("While She Was Singing (Di Da Di)", it was re-released worldwide with the new title "Di Da Di (And So the Story Goes)" and later just as "Di Da Di". Outside Denmark, it is her most successful song to date and a huge hit in Spain, where it peaked at number 5. It was also a hit in Finland, where it peaked at number 16, in Iceland and in Belgium. There has been sold 1,8 million singles of the song. There was made a music video to accompany it, featuring Montell performing while sitting in an orange chair.

Track listing

Charts

References

 

1997 singles
1997 songs
English-language Danish songs